Orak Island may refer to one the three Turkish islands in the Aegean Sea
Orak Island (Çanakkale)
Orak Island (İzmir)
Orak Island (Muğla)